In mathematics, particularly algebraic topology, cohomotopy sets are particular contravariant functors from the category of pointed topological spaces and basepoint-preserving continuous maps to the category of sets and functions. They are dual to the homotopy groups, but less studied.

Overview
The p-th cohomotopy set of a pointed topological space X is defined by

For p = 1 this set has an abelian group structure, and, provided  is a CW-complex, is isomorphic to the first cohomology group , since the circle  is an Eilenberg–MacLane space of type . In fact, it is a theorem of Heinz Hopf that if  is a CW-complex of dimension at most p, then   is in bijection with the p-th cohomology group .

Properties
Some basic facts about cohomotopy sets, some more obvious than others:

  for all p and q.
(To prove this result, Lev Pontryagin developed the concept of framed cobordism.)
 If  has  for all x, then , and the homotopy is smooth if f and g are.
 For  a compact smooth manifold,  is isomorphic to the set of homotopy classes of smooth maps ; in this case, every continuous map can be uniformly approximated by a smooth map and any homotopic smooth maps will be smoothly homotopic.
 If  is an -manifold with boundary, the set  is canonically in bijection with the set of cobordism classes of codimension-p framed submanifolds of the interior .

which is an abelian group.

References

Homotopy theory